Larutia sumatrensis is a species of skink. It is endemic to Sumatra (Indonesia).

References

sumatrensis
Reptiles of Indonesia
Endemic fauna of Sumatra
Reptiles described in 1860
Taxa named by Pieter Bleeker